Neocalyptis owadai is a species of moth of the family Tortricidae. It is located in Taiwan.

References

	

Moths described in 1992
Neocalyptis